Jules-Adenis de Colombeau (28 June 1823 – 1900) was a 19th-century French opera librettist, playwright, and journalist. 

Adenis was born in Paris and studied at the Collège royal de Bourbon (now the Lycée Condorcet). Colombeau was initially employed by the Compagnie de Saint-Gobain. At this time he was already working for various newspapers and magazines.

Some of Colombeau's works include Un Postillon en gage (1856) Sylvie (1864), and La Grand'tante (1867).

Both of Colombeau's sons, Eugène (1854–1923) and Édouard (1867–1952) became writers and librettists.

La Fiancée d'Abydos
La Fiancée d'Abydos, premiered 30 December 1865 at the Théâtre-Lyrique
Libretto: Jules Adenis
Music: Adrien Barthe
Mise en scène : Léon Carvalho
Lithographs : Pierre-Auguste Lamy
Décorateurs: Joseph Thierry et Charles-Antoine Cambon

Works
Opera librettos
1856: Un Postillon en gage, one-act operetta, with Édouard Plouvier, music by Jacques Offenbach, Théâtre des Bouffes-Parisiens, 9 February
1863: Madame Pygmalion, one-act opérette bouffe, with Francis Tourte, music by Frédéric Barbier, Théâtre des Bouffes-Parisiens, 6 February
1864: Sylvie, one-act opéra comique, with Jules Rostaing, music by Ernest Guiraud, Opéra-Comique, 11 May
1865: La Fiancée d'Abydos, opera in 4 acts and 5 tableaux, music by Adrien Barthe, Théâtre-Lyrique, 30 December
1867: La Grand'tante, one-act opéra comique, with Charles Grandvallet, music by Jules Massenet, Opéra-comique, 3 April
1867: La Jolie fille de Perth, opera in 4 acts and 5 tableaux, after Walter Scott, with Henri de Saint-Georges, music by Georges Bizet, Théâtre-Lyrique impérial, 26 December
1868: La Contessina, three-act opéra-seria, with Henri de Saint-Georges, Italian text by Achille de Lauzières, music by Joseph Poniatowski, Théâtre Italien, 28 April
1873: Les Trois Souhaits, one-act opéra comique, music by Ferdinand Poise, Opéra-Comique, 29 October
1878: La Zingarella, one-act opéra comique, music by Joseph O'Kelly, Opéra-Comique, 26 February La Zingarella, with Jules Montini
1884: Le Portrait, two-act opéra comique, with Laurencin, music by Théodore Lajarte, Opéra-Comique, 18 June
1886: Les Templiers, opera in 5 acts and 7 tableaux, with Paul-Armand Silvestre and Lionel Bonnemère, music by Henry Litolff, Bruxelles, Théâtre de la Monnaie, 25 January
1886: Juge et Partie, two-act opéra comique, after Montfleury, music by Edmond Missa, Opéra-Comique, 17 November
1897: Le Légataire universel (with Lionel Bonnemère, after Jean-François Regnard), "opéra bouffe" in 3 acts, music by Georges Pfeiffer
1907: Marcella, music by Umberto Giordano
Theatre
1852: Une Nuit orageuse, two-act comedy, mingled with song, with Armand d'Artois, Théâtre du Vaudeville, 18 September
1854: Ne touchez pas à la hache!, "comédie-vaudeville" in 1 act (with Édouard Plouvier), Paris, Théâtre des Folies-Dramatiques, 15 April Text online
1854: Ô le meilleur des pères, comédie en vaudeville, with Adrien Decourcelle, Théâtre des Variétés, 10 June
1855: Philanthropie et repentir, "comédie-vaudeville" in 1 act, Théâtre des Variétés, 25 April
1855: Trop beau pour rien faire, one-act comedy mingled with song, with Édouard Plouvier, Théâtre du Vaudeville, 13 November
1857: La Crise de ménage, one-act comedy mingled with songs, with Édouard Plouvier, Théâtre des Variétés, 23 December
1859: Feu le capitaine Octave, one-act comedy, with Édouard Plouvier, Théâtre du Vaudeville, 19 March
1860: Si Pontoise le savait!, "comédie-vaudeville" in 1 act, with Laurencin and Francis Tourte, Théâtre du Palais-Royal, 25 February
1860: Une Bonne pour tout faire, "comédie-vaudeville" in 1 act, with Jules Rostaing, Théâtre Déjazet, 16 March
1860: Toute seule, one-act comedy mingled with song, with Édouard Plouvier, Théâtre du Vaudeville, 4 July
1868: La Czarine, drama in 5 acts and 8 tableaux, with Octave Gastineau, Théâtre de l'Ambigu-Comique, 30 May Text online
'1874: 'L'Officier de fortune, drama in 5 acts and 10 tableaux, including a prologue, with Jules Rostaing, Théâtre de l'Ambigu-Comique, 11 September
1879: L'Abîme de Trayas, drama in 5 acts and 6 tableaux, with Jules Rostaing, Théâtre de Cluny, 16 January
Varia
1887–1889: Le Théâtre chez soi. Contes et légendes en action. Charades en trois parties, 5 vols.
1892: Les Étapes d'un touriste en France. De Marseille à Menton'' Text online

References

External links
 

1823 births
1900 deaths
19th-century French dramatists and playwrights
19th-century French male writers
French opera librettists
Writers from Paris